Belaynesh is a feminine Ethiopian given name. Notable people with the name include:

Belaynesh Fikadu (born 1987), Ethiopian long-distance runner
Belaynesh Oljira (born 1990), Ethiopian long-distance runner
Belaynesh Zevadia (born 1967), Ethiopian-born Israeli diplomat

Ethiopian given names